The Collection is a compilation album by Spanish duo Baccara released on label BMG-Ariola in 1993. This compilation includes recordings by the original formation of the duo, Mayte Mateos and María Mendiola, taken from their RCA-Victor studio albums Baccara (1977), Light My Fire (1978), Colours (1979), Bad Boys (1981) and the greatest hits collection The Hits Of Baccara (1978). The Collection was re-issued in 1998 with alternative cover art.

Track listing

 "Sorry, I'm a Lady"  (Dostal - Soja)  - 3:39
 "Heart, Body and Soul"  (Sacher)  - 4:11
 "Spend The Night"  (Sacher)  - 3:09  
 "Cara Mia"  (Docker)  - 2:58  
 "Woman to Woman"  (Sacher)  - 3:30 
 "Yes Sir, I Can Boogie"  (Dostal - Soja)  - 4:35 
 "Boogaloo"  (Sacher)  - 2:40
 "Colorado"  (Sacher)  - 3:33 
 "Darling" (7" version)  (Dostal - Soja)  - 5:26
 "Ohio"  (Sacher)  - 3:05   
 "Parlez-Vous Français?" (English Version) (Dostal - Soja - Zentner)  - 4:30
 "Yummy, Yummy, Yummy"  (Levine - Resnick)  - 3:35  
 "Ay, Ay Sailor"  (Dostal - Soja)  - 3:50  
 "Baby, Why Don't You Reach Out?" / "Light My Fire" (Edited version) (Dostal - Soja) (Densmore - Krieger - Manzarek - Morrison)  - 4:45
 "Mucho, Mucho"  (Sacher)  - 3:26  
 "The Devil Sent You To Lorado"  (Dostal - Soja)  - 4:03 
 "My Kisses Need A Cavalier"  (Dostal - Soja)  - 4:52
 "Body-Talk"  (Dostal - Soja)  - 4:38
 "Bad Boys"  (Sacher)  - 4:23

Personnel
 Mayte Mateos – vocals
 María Mendiola – vocals

Production
 Produced and arranged by Rolf Soja.
 Tracks 2, 3, 5, 7, 8, 10, 15 & 19 arranged by Bruce Baxter, produced by Graham Sacher.

Track annotations
 Tracks 1, 4 & 6 from 1977 studio album Baccara.
 Tracks 2, 3, 5, 7, 8, 10, 15 & 19 from 1981 studio album Bad Boys.
 Track 9 from 1978 7" single "Darling". Full-length version appears on album Light My Fire.
 Track 11 from 1978 7" single "Parlez-Vous Français? (English version)". Original French version appears on album Light My Fire.
 Tracks 12 & 17 from 1978 studio album Light My Fire.
 Tracks 13 & 18 from 1979 studio album Colours.
 Track 14 edited version taken from 1978 compilation The Hits Of Baccara. Full-length version appears on album Light My Fire.
 Track 16 from 1978 compilation The Hits Of Baccara.

References

Baccara albums
1993 compilation albums
Bertelsmann Music Group compilation albums